is a former Japanese football player.

Playing career
Miyazaki was born in Yamaga on February 6, 1981. After graduating from high school, he joined J1 League club Sanfrecce Hiroshima in 1999. Although he played several matches in 2001, he could hardly play in the match at the club in 3 seasons. In 2002, he moved to J2 League club Avispa Fukuoka. He played many matches as regular player and the club was promoted to J1 from 2006. Although his opportunity to play decreased from 2006 and the club was relegated to J2 in a year. In 2008, he moved to J2 club Montedio Yamagata. He played many matches and the club was promoted to J1 from 2009. His opportunity to play decreased from 2010 and the club finished at bottom place in 2011 and was relegated to J2 from 2012. In 2012, he moved to J2 club Tokushima Vortis. He played many matches and the club was promoted to J1 from 2014. Although his opportunity to play decreased and the club finished at bottom place in 2014 and was relegated to J2 from 2015. He retired end of 2014 season.

Club statistics

References

External links

1981 births
Living people
Association football people from Kumamoto Prefecture
Japanese footballers
J1 League players
J2 League players
Sanfrecce Hiroshima players
Avispa Fukuoka players
Montedio Yamagata players
Tokushima Vortis players
Association football midfielders